A high-value detention site or HVD, in current U.S. military parlance, is a prison for those who may have valuable intelligence to offer, or who have inherent military or political significance. An example is former Iraqi president Saddam Hussein, as well as senior members of his regime. Other prisoners of these sites include members of Al-Qaeda, captured during the War on Terrorism.

List of sites
 Bagram prison (2001–2012) in Afghanistan
 Guantánamo Bay (est. 2002) in Cuba
 Abu Ghraib prison (2004–2006) in Iraq
 Camp Cropper (est. 2003) near Baghdad International Airport, Iraq

Imprisonment and detention in the United States